Abel Luckyfizzo Horton (born 7 March 1995) is a Liberian professional footballer who last played  as an attacking midfielder or winger for Portuguese club S.C. Esmoriz and the Liberia national team.

Club career 
From 2012 to 2014, Horton played for LISCR FC.
In 2015, he joined Swedish club KF Velebit on a one-year deal.
He joined Swedish division two club Lärje-Angereds IF in 2017.
In August 2018, he joined  Mozambican topflight club Clube de Desportos da Costa do Sol.
He joined Portuguese club S.C. Esmoriz in 2019.

International career
Horton has represented Liberia at the under-20 and under-23 levels.
In 2013, Horton accepted the call to play for the Liberian senior team in the qualifying rounds of the 2014 FIFA World Cup against the Angola.

References

External links 

 
   

1995 births
Living people
Sportspeople from Monrovia
Liberian footballers
Association football wingers
Association football midfielders
Liberia international footballers
Liberian expatriate footballers
LISCR FC players
Liberian expatriate sportspeople in Mozambique
Expatriate footballers in Mozambique
Liberian expatriate sportspeople in Portugal
Expatriate footballers in Sweden
Liberian expatriate sportspeople in Sweden